Hayri Arsebük (8 February 1915 – 1943) was a Turkish basketball player. He competed in the men's tournament at the 1936 Summer Olympics.

References

1915 births
1943 deaths
Turkish men's basketball players
Olympic basketball players of Turkey
Basketball players at the 1936 Summer Olympics
Place of birth missing